is a Japanese footballer currently playing as a defender for Toledo.

Career statistics

Club
.

Notes

References

1998 births
Living people
Japanese footballers
Japanese expatriate footballers
Association football defenders
Toledo Esporte Clube players
Japanese expatriate sportspeople in Brazil
Expatriate footballers in Brazil